Nicholas Summerbee (born 26 August 1971) is an English former professional footballer, sports television pundit and commentator.

He notably played in the Premier League for Swindon Town, Manchester City and Sunderland, as well as in the Football League for Bolton Wanderers, Nottingham Forest, Leicester City, Bradford City and Tranmere Rovers before finishing his career with Non-league Tamworth. He was capped by both the England U21 and England B sides.

Club career

Swindon Town
Born in Altrincham, he had trials at Manchester United, Leicester City, and Norwich City, before joining Swindon Town; where his father, former England international Mike Summerbee, had connections. Summerbee played 112 games in seven years for the Robins, scoring six goals and helping them get promoted to the Premier League in 1993 before Manchester City paid £1.3million for his services a year later.

Manchester City
Summerbee joined Manchester City in 1994. His father Mike had become a household name at the club being part of the successful City team of the late 1960s and early 1970s and also being part of the star trio of Mike Summerbee, Francis Lee and Colin Bell. Summerbee joined the team at a time when manager Brian Horton also brought in Peter Beagrie, Uwe Rosler and Paul Walsh. In his first season Manchester City finished towards the bottom end of the Premiership table. Then chairman Francis Lee replaced manager Brian Horton with Alan Ball who failed to manage the team to increased success. The team were relegated to the first division. In the summer of 1997 he was offered a trial by the French club Bordeaux. In November 1997, Summerbee joined Sunderland in a £1million-rated swap deal involving Craig Russell.

Sunderland
Summerbee made his Sunderland debut on 15 November 1997, against Portsmouth at Fratton Park, as a second-half substitute for Martin Smith. With trademark un-tucked shirt and orange edged boots, Summerbee capped his debut by notching the final goal in a 4–1 victory, scoring with a satisfying low drive. He played out the rest of the season on the right hand side of midfield and enjoyed some of the finest moments of his career after Sunderland won promotion to the Premiership in 1999.

During that season, an injured Summerbee enjoyed a well-publicised liaison with TV presenter, Melanie Sykes. However, it came at a cost. He lost his place in the team following his capital night out with Mel and a 4–1 defeat at Arsenal. Whilst he returned after one match, Summerbee was substituted in both of his next two games and was relegated to the bench for the next four. He returned triumphantly to the starting eleven by scoring his first goal of the season against Everton. It turned out to be his last as a Sunderland player. After this goal, Summerbee was in and out of the side. He finished the season on a high note though, starting in – and starring in – the final three games.

Summerbee was left in the wilderness by boss Peter Reid the following season. He sat on the sidelines for six months until he was given a game for the reserves against Newcastle United. He was clearly unfit and unhappy, he lashed out at Newcastle United defender Andy Griffin and was immediately substituted before he could be sent off.

Later career
Free transfers and quick stays at the likes of Bolton Wanderers (where he scored once against Crystal Palace), Leicester City and Nottingham Forest were followed by a two and a half-year stay at Bradford City, which included loan spells at Swindon Town and Tranmere Rovers.

Summerbee latterly played for Conference National side Tamworth, but was released at the end of the 2005–06 season.

International career
On 10 May 1994, Summerbee won an England 'B' cap in a match against Northern Ireland 'B' at Hillsborough.

Personal life
He is the son of Manchester City cult hero Mike Summerbee. His grandfather, George Summerbee, and great uncle, Gordon Summerbee, had also been professional footballers. Nick is married and has three children.

Media career
Since retirement Summerbee has worked as a Radio co-commentator for BBC Radio Five, as well as being a local pundit for Manchester City games.

As of September 20th, 2020 Summerbee is a pundit for beIN Sports.

Honours
Sunderland
 Football League Division 1 winner: 1998–99
Individual
Sunderland Solid Gold XI

References

External links

1971 births
Living people
People from Altrincham
English footballers
Swindon Town F.C. players
England B international footballers
England under-21 international footballers
Manchester City F.C. players
Sunderland A.F.C. players
Bolton Wanderers F.C. players
Leicester City F.C. players
Nottingham Forest F.C. players
Tranmere Rovers F.C. players
Tamworth F.C. players
Bradford City A.F.C. players
Association football midfielders
Premier League players
English Football League players
National League (English football) players
People educated at Hillcrest Grammar School
Footballers from Greater Manchester